Slovenia competed at the 2022 Winter Olympics in Beijing, China, from 4 to 20 February 2022.

Alpine skier Ilka Štuhec and snowboarder Žan Košir were initially chosen as the flag-bearers at the opening ceremony, however, as Košir tested positive for COVID-19, he was replaced by fellow snowboarder Rok Marguč. Anita Klemenčič was the flagbearer during the closing ceremony.

Medalists 

The following Slovenian competitors won medals at the games. In the discipline sections below, the medalists' names are bolded.

Competitors
The following is the list of number of competitors participating at the Games per sport/discipline.

Alpine skiing

Slovenia participated with four male and seven female alpine skiers.

Men

Women

Mixed

Biathlon
Slovenia sent 2 women and 4 men to the Olympics.

Men

Women

Mixed relay

Cross-country skiing

Slovenia sent 5 women and 4 men to the Olympics.

Distance
Men

Women

Sprint
Men

Women

Nordic Combined
Slovenia sent 1 athlete to the Olympics.

Ski jumping

Slovenia sent 4 women and 5 men to the Olympics.

Men

Women

Mixed Team

Snowboarding
Slovenia sent 2 women and 4 men to the Olympics.

Freestyle

Parallel

References

Nations at the 2022 Winter Olympics
2022
Winter Olympics